Verena Steinhauser (born 14 October 1994) is an Italian triathlete. She competed in the women's event at the 2020 Summer Olympics held in Tokyo, Japan. She also competed in the mixed relay event.

References

External links
 
 

1994 births
Living people
Italian female triathletes
Olympic triathletes of Italy
Triathletes at the 2020 Summer Olympics
Sportspeople from Brixen
21st-century Italian women